Robert Lawless (October 4, 1937 – February 2, 2012) was an American cultural anthropologist. He did fieldwork in the Philippines, New York City, Haiti, and Florida. He received his PhD at New School for Social Research in 1975, his M.A. at University of the Philippines in 1968, and his BSJ at Northwestern University in 1959. He was a professor of anthropology at the University of Florida, and most recently, at Wichita State University.

References 

1937 births
2012 deaths
American anthropologists
University of Florida faculty
The New School alumni
Wichita State University faculty
Place of birth missing
Medill School of Journalism alumni
University of the Philippines alumni